Agononida madagascerta is a species of squat lobster in the family Munididae. It is found, as the species name suggests, off the coast of Madagascar.

References

Squat lobsters
Crustaceans described in 2014